Huangdi is a town under the administration of Huojia County, Henan, China. , it administers the following eleven villages:
Huangdi Village
Nanmachang Village
Beimachang Village
Jiangying Village
Shiziying Village
Anyi Village
Sunzhuang Village
Zhangzhaizhuang Village
Liuqiao Village
Ximachang Village
Zhongmachang Village

References 

Township-level divisions of Henan
Huojia County